= Anna Kobylarz =

Connecticut-based humanitarian worker

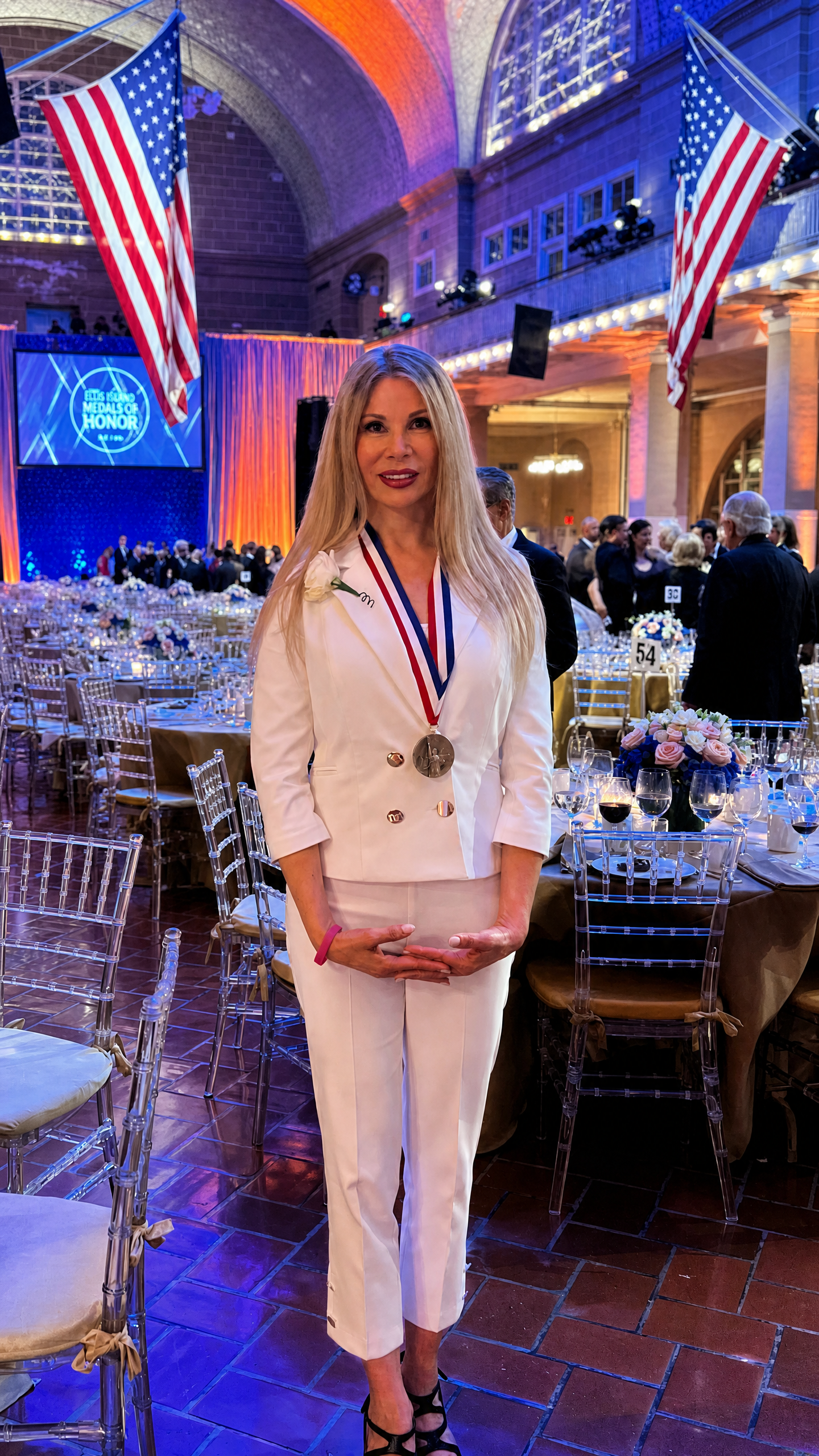
Kobylarz at an event.

Anna Kobylarz is a Connecticut-based humanitarian worker whose relief efforts for children affected by the Russian invasion of Ukraine have been covered by Connecticut news outlets. Reporting has described her repeated trips to Ukraine, support for the City of Goodness shelter and charitable work for children in Connecticut.

== Humanitarian work ==
Kobylarz is a Berlin, Connecticut, resident who emigrated from Poland to Connecticut. In 2022, following the start of Russia's full-scale invasion of Ukraine, she traveled to Poland and Ukraine to support refugees and children affected by the war.

By January 2023, the Hartford Courant reported that she was leaving for her ninth trip to Ukraine in a year. The newspaper described her fundraising for buildings at the City of Goodness, including a bomb shelter, generators, and a planned rehabilitation center for children. That month, NBC Connecticut similarly reported that she had returned to Ukraine more than eight times, providing aid to children and helping to raise funds for a child-oriented shelter and rehabilitation-center project.

In November 2023, NBC Connecticut reported that Kobylarz had returned from her twelfth trip since the war began. The report said that she had helped bring supplies and funding to the City of Goodness and had recently helped open a medical center there. In May 2025, the Hartford Courant reported that she had made 19 trips to Ukraine and had helped raise funds for a three-story children's medical center associated with the City of Goodness, with space for rehabilitation, medical treatment, and hospice care.

== Connecticut charitable work ==
In 2025, the Hartford Courant reported that Kobylarz had opened the Anna Kobylarz Hope Foundation in Connecticut and that its Butterfly Closet program provided clothing and personal-care items to children referred by partner agencies. The newspaper described the program as operating from a warehouse in New Britain and serving children from infancy through age 18.
